Gasherbrum V is a mountain in the Gasherbrum massif, located in the Karakoram range of Gilgit–Baltistan, Pakistan.

Location and naming 

The Gasherbrum massif is a remote group of peaks located at the northeastern end of the Baltoro Glacier in the Karakoram range of the Himalaya. The massif contains three of the world's 8,000 metre peaks (if one includes Broad Peak).  Gasherbrum is often claimed to mean "Shining Wall", presumably a reference to the highly visible face of Gasherbrum IV; but in fact it comes from "rgasha" (beautiful) + "brum" (mountain) in Balti, hence it actually means "beautiful mountain."

While the four highest Gasherbrum peaks (Gasherbrum I to IV) have been named and numbered since the 19th century, Gasherbrum V (as well as its neighbour Gasherbrum VI) were only considered as "Peaks on the south ridge of Gasherbrum IV". The Swiss Geologist and Himalayan expert Günter Oskar Dyhrenfurth recommended to give this independent mountain an own name and proposed in 1934 the name of "Gasherbrum V", which is now well established.

Altitude and climbing status 

Although in former literature a height around 7,320 m was traditionally given, the mountain is more likely to be around 7,150 m high. The Russian military 1:100,000 topographical map shows a height of 7,120 m. The currently most accurate map of the region probably is that in the series of "Maps of Snow Mountains in China", which gives a height of 7,147 m. On this map the pass connecting to Gasherbrum III is 6,493 m high (654 m prominence).

See also
 Concordia (Pakistan)
 Northern Areas
 List of mountains in Pakistan

Notes

External links
 8000ers.com

Mountains of Gilgit-Baltistan
Seven-thousanders of the Karakoram